The National Union for Independence and Revolution (UNIR) was the ruling party in Chad between 1984 and 1990. It was founded in June 1984 by President Hissène Habré as a successor of his Armed Forces of the North, the insurgent group through which Habré had conquered power in 1982. The party was banned six years later by Idriss Déby when he assumed power by overthrowing Habré in the 1990 coup d'état.

Background
In 1965 Chad had was plunged in civil war, in a rebellion representing a rekindling of traditional animosities between the Muslim northern and central regions and the predominantly non-Muslim people of the south who had dominated the government and civil service since independence. A turning point in the conflict was represented by the conquest in 1979 of the capital, N'Djamena, by northern insurgents; although the struggle continued with increasing severity, its shape now changed, developing in a conflict between the two main northern leaders, Hissène Habré, leader of the Armed Forces of the North (FAN), and Goukouni Oueddei, leader of the People's Armed Forces (FAP).

After the fall of N'Djamena, the rival factions signed in Lagos an accord which created the Transitional Government of National Union (GUNT), with Goukouni as President and Habré as Defence Minister. The accord broke down in 1980 with the Second Battle of N'Djamena, when Habré rebelled and was expelled from the GUNT. While defeated in 1980 due to Libyan intervention, he was able two years later, on June 7 1982, to secure control of the capital and expel the GUNT.

On assuming power, Habré issued on September 29 a constitution which put at the centre the FAN's executive body, the Command Council, which became the country's ultimate fount of power and was entitled to appoint and also call to account the President.

Foundation of the UNIR
Habré's political support came primarily from northerners, the army that brought him to power, and civilians who supported his opposition to Libyan interference in Chadian affairs. To broaden his support, in 1984 he undertook a program to extend the reach of government into rural areas, first by seeking the advice of the nation's prefects. Southern prefects advised that in addition to lingering animosity based on the early association of FAN with FROLINAT, which had worked to oust the southern-based government of François Tombalbaye, a major concern in that region was the conduct of the army. The army had become, in effect, an obstacle to security.

Following this Habré, during the celebrations for the second anniversary of his rise to power, held a speech on June 7 in which he announced that the FAN, after the dissolution of the old FAN militia in the new Chadian National Armed Forces, was to also be considered dissolved, and should thus evolve itself into something new. He also added that an extraordinary congress of the FAN was to be called in short time. The first congress of the FROLINAT-FAN was opened on June 20, opened by a speech of the President in which he attacked Libyan presence in northern Chad as an attempt to "wipe out our traditional and ancestral values". Two days later, on June 22, the congress announced the formal dissolution of the FAN, that was replaced on June 24 by the National Union for Independence and Revolution, a movement whose aims were declared to be the establishment of democratic political life, freedom of expression and opposition to "religious fanaticism".

The congress was closed on June 27 by Habré, who in his closing speech announced the merge in the new movement of three political parties already allied with the government, representing the Minister of Health Abba Siddick's Frolinat Originel, Delwa Kassiré Koumakoye's National Rally for Development and Progress and Minister of State Djidingar Dono Ngardoum's Assembly for Unity and Chadian Democracy. The latter two represented southern élite parties, and their assimilation was pivotal to guarantee the formation of a state party through which the whole political élite of the country would be represented in the government and the National Consultative Council. 

The creation of the UNIR did not take place without opposition: the GUNT counter-government argued that he lacked the authority to dissolve the FROLINAT, as the FAN was merely a dissident group which had been excluded from the main group. The GUNT's chairman, Goukouni, added that with the creation of the UNIR Habré "has cleared yet another obstacle in his betrayal of the Chadian revolution". Strong opposition also manifested itself among many of the delegates with hot debates, concerning in particular the abandonment of the old FAN name, as many militants had been long accustomed to it. According to Robert Buijtenhuijs, the delay of the congress had been due mostly to Habré's fear to be put in minority by the FAN's old guard, and he had to impose himself forcefully to coaxe in obedience his former comrades.

Organization
On June 26, the day before the end of the congress, the delegates elected by acclamation President Hissène Habré chairman of the movement and proceeded to form, on Habré's proposals, a Central Committee composed of 80 members. Of the 43 members that had composed the Command Council of the FAN, only 18 were inserted in the new central committee. As part of an attempt to leave the political pro-northern "ghetto" in which Habré was confined and establish a fairer the equilibrium between north and sorth, 25 of the 80 selected members were southerners.

The day after the closing of the congress, on June 28, the Central Committee convened for the first time and proceeded to nominate the members of the Executive Bureau, a 15-strong body chaired by the President and meant to serve as the primary liaison between the party and the government. Those selected were chosen, as for the Central Committee, on proposal of the President. Among them, 9 were military officers; as for their regional extraction, 6 were southerners (including the executive secretary Gouara Lassou), with the remaining northerners. Among the prefectures of Chad, the most represented were the BET, Habré's native region, with 4 members and 3 from the Moyen-Chari.

Electoral history

Presidential elections

National Assembly elections

Note
The country was a one party state as a result of the 1989 referendum but all candidates stood for the election as independents.

References

1984 establishments in Chad
1990 disestablishments in Chad
Banned political parties
Defunct political parties in Chad
Nationalist parties in Africa
Parties of one-party systems
Political parties disestablished in 1990
Political parties established in 1984